The 13th Floor Elevators was an American rock band from Austin, Texas, United States, formed by guitarist and vocalist Roky Erickson, electric jug player Tommy Hall, and guitarist Stacy Sutherland. The band was together from 1965 to 1969, and during that period released four albums and seven singles for the International Artists record label.

The Elevators were the first band to refer to their music as psychedelic rock, with the first-known use of the term appearing on their business card in January 1966. The 2005 documentary You're Gonna Miss Me specifically credits Tommy Hall with coining the term "psychedelic rock." Their contemporary influence has been acknowledged by 1960s musicians such as Billy Gibbons of ZZ Top, Peter Albin of Big Brother and the Holding Company, and Chris Gerniottis of Zakary Thaks.

The 13th Floor Elevators debut single "You're Gonna Miss Me", a national Billboard No. 55 hit in 1966, was featured on the 1972 compilation Nuggets: Original Artyfacts from the First Psychedelic Era, 1965-1968. Seminal punk rock band Television played the Elevator's song "Fire Engine" live in the mid-1970s. In the 1980s and 1990s, the 13th Floor Elevators influenced bands such as Primal Scream, the Shamen,  Lime Spiders and Spacemen 3, all of whom covered their songs, and 14 Iced Bears who use an electric jug on their single "Beautiful Child". In 2009, International Artists released a ten CD box set entitled Sign of the 3-Eyed Men, which included the mono and new, alternative, stereo mixes of the original albums, together with two albums of previously unreleased material and a number of rare live recordings.

History

Formation
The 13th Floor Elevators emerged on the local Austin music scene in December 1965, where they were contemporary to bands such as the Wig and the Babycakes and later followed by Shiva's Headband and the Conqueroo. The band formed when Roky Erickson left his group the Spades, and joined up with Stacy Sutherland, Benny Thurman, and John Ike Walton who had been playing Texas coastal towns as the Lingsmen. Tommy Hall was instrumental in bringing the band members together, and joined the group as lyricist and electric jug player.  The band's name developed from a suggestion by drummer John Ike Walton to use the name "Elevators". Clementine Hall added "13th Floor". In addition to an awareness that a number of tall buildings in the US lack a designated 13th floor, it was noted that the letter "M" (for marijuana) is the thirteenth letter of the alphabet.

1966-1967: Psychedelic Sounds and Easter Everywhere
In early January 1966, producer Gordon Bynum brought the band to Houston to record two songs to release as a single on his newly formed Contact record label. The songs were Erickson's "You're Gonna Miss Me", and Hall-Sutherland's "Tried to Hide". Some months later, the International Artists label picked it up and re-released it.

Throughout the spring of 1966, the group toured extensively in Texas, playing clubs in Austin, Dallas, and Houston. They also played on live teen dance shows on TV, such as Sumpin Else, in Dallas, and The Larry Kane Show in Houston. During the Summer, the IA re-release of "You're Gonna Miss Me" became popular outside Texas, especially in Miami, Detroit, and the San Francisco Bay Area. In October 1966, it peaked on the national Billboard chart at the No. 55 position. Prompted by the success of the single, the Elevators toured the west coast, made two nationally televised appearances for Dick Clark, and played several dates at the San Francisco ballrooms The Fillmore and The Avalon.

The International Artists record label in Houston, also home to contemporary Texas underground groups such as Red Krayola and Bubble Puppy, signed the Elevators to a record contract and released the album The Psychedelic Sounds of the 13th Floor Elevators in November 1966, which became popular among the burgeoning counterculture. Tommy Hall's sleeve-notes for the album, which advocated chemical agents (such as LSD) as a gateway to a higher, 'non-Aristotelian' state of consciousness, has also contributed to the album's cult status.

During their California tour, the band shared bills with Quicksilver Messenger Service, the Great Society (featuring Grace Slick), and Moby Grape. On returning to Texas in early 1967, they released a second single, "Levitation", and continued to play live in Austin, Houston and other Texas cities. In November 1967, the band released a second album, Easter Everywhere.  The album featured a cover of Bob Dylan's "It's All Over Now, Baby Blue". However, shortly before work began on Easter Everywhere, Walton and Leatherman left the band and were replaced by Danny Thomas on drums and Dan Galindo on bass, because of disputes over mismanagement of the band's career by International Artists and a fundamental disagreement between Walton and Hall over the latter's advocacy of the use of LSD in the pursuit of achieving a higher state of human consciousness. As a result, they were not credited in the Easter Everywhere sleevenotes, despite having appeared on "(I've Got) Levitation" and "She Lives (In a Time of Her Own)". Despite the lengthy studio work and resources utilized, Easter Everywhere was not the success the band and International Artists had hoped for. Lacking a hit single and released too late in the year, it sold out its original run, but was never reprinted, suggesting somewhat disappointing sales. Record label paperwork indicate that the band's debut album sold upwards of 40,000 copies during its original run, while Easter Everywhere may have sold around 10,000 copies.

At one point around 1967, Erickson was a roommate of future cult musician Townes Van Zandt. Erickson insisted that he join the Elevators on bass, even though he was a guitarist who had never played bass before. He auditioned for Hall, but Hall rejected him.

1968-69: Bull of the Woods and breakup
While the band were unable to repeat their national success, they were still a powerful presence on the Texas rock music scene. Chris Gerniottis, ex-lead singer of Zakary Thaks has spoken repeatedly of how the Elevators stood apart from all the other bands on the regional scene, and they continued to influence these bands during the late 1960s. Following the local popularity of the track "Slip Inside This House", an edited version was released as a single in early 1968 and was played frequently on Houston radio.

Meanwhile, the Elevators had lost their bass player Dan Galindo, who went on to another International Artists band, the Rubiayat. Duke Davis briefly replaced Galindo, before the band's earlier bassist Ronnie Leatherman returned in the Summer of 1968. As documented in a lengthy interview and article in the Texas underground music magazine Mother No. 3, the band worked all Spring of 1968 on their new album, which at one point was to be called Beauty and the Beast. However, because of an unstable member line-up and the increasingly erratic behavior of the psychedelicized Tommy Hall and mentally fragile Roky Erickson, little of value came out of these sessions. The live shows had lost their original energy, and often the band would perform without their lead singer Erickson, due to his recurring hospital treatments at the time. The last concert featuring the "real" Elevators occurred in April 1968.

International Artists put out a Live LP in August 1968, which was composed of old demo tapes and outtakes dating back to 1966 for the most part, with fake applause and audience noise added. Around this time, the original 13th Floor Elevators disbanded, as the nucleus of Erickson-Hall-Sutherland had been reduced to guitarist Stacy Sutherland only. Sutherland brought some of his own songs for a final set of studio sessions, which led to the dark, intense posthumous album Bull of the Woods. Initially disliked by many Elevators fans, it has found a substantial fan-base today, with some even rating it the band's best LP. These final sessions consisted of Sutherland on guitar, Ronnie Leatherman on bass, and Danny Thomas on drums. Bull of the Woods was largely the work of Stacy Sutherland. Erickson, due to health and legal problems, and Tommy Hall were only involved with a few tracks, including "Livin' On", "Never Another", "Dear Doctor Doom", and "May the Circle Remain Unbroken". A few live gigs were played around Texas during the second half of 1968, until an article in Rolling Stone magazine in December 1968 declared the band gone. International Artists pulled together the various studio recordings from 1968 and, with the assistance of drummer Danny Thomas, added some horn arrangements, which became the Bull of the Woods album, released in March 1969. The final 13th Floor Elevators record released by International Artists was a reissue of the "You're Gonna Miss Me" single in mid-1969.

Singer Janis Joplin was a close associate of Clementine Hall and the band. She opened for the band at a benefit concert in Austin, and considered joining the group prior to heading to San Francisco and joining Big Brother and the Holding Company.

Drug overuse and related legal problems left the band in a state of constant turmoil, which took its toll, both physically and mentally, on the members. In 1969, facing a felony marijuana possession charge, Roky Erickson chose to be admitted to a psychiatric hospital rather than serve a prison term, thus signaling the end of the band's career.

Music
During the initial months of their existence as a band, the electric guitars used both by Roky Erickson and Stacy Sutherland were Gibson ES-330s. Sutherland's pioneering use of reverb and echo, and bluesy, acid-drenched guitar predates such bands as ZZ Top, Butthole Surfers, and the Black Angels. According to Billy Gibbons of ZZ Top, in the documentary You're Gonna Miss Me, the guitars were run through Fender Blackface Twin Reverbs, Fender Reverb Units (referred to as a "tube reverb" or "reverb tank"), and Gibson Maestro FZ-1 Fuzz-Tones.

A special aspect of the Elevators' sound came from Tommy Hall's innovative electric jug. The jug, a crock-jug with a microphone held up to it while it was being blown, sounded somewhat like a cross between a minimoog and cuica drum.  In contrast to traditional musical jug technique, Hall did not blow into the jug to produce a tuba-like sound.  Instead, he vocalized musical runs into the mouth of the jug, using the jug to create echo and distortion of his voice.  When playing live, he held the microphone up to the mouth of the jug, but when recording the Easter Everywhere album, the recording engineer placed a microphone inside the jug to enhance the sound.

At Tommy Hall's urging, the band often played their live shows and recorded their albums while under the influence of LSD, and built their lifestyle and music around the psychedelic experience. Intellectual and esoteric influences helped shape their work, which shows traces of Gurdjieff, the General Semantics of Alfred Korzybski, the psychedelic philosophy of Timothy Leary, and Tantric meditation.

Members
The original 13th Floor Elevators line-up was built around singer/guitarist Roky Erickson, electric jug player Tommy Hall, and guitarist Stacy Sutherland. The rhythm section went through several changes, with drummer John Ike Walton and bass player Ronnie Leatherman being replaced in July 1967. Walton and Leatherman left the band; in their stead were new recruits Danny Thomas (drums, piano) and Dan Galindo (bass) which completed the classic Elevators line-up. Hall remained the band's primary lyricist and philosopher, with Sutherland and Erickson both contributing lyrics as well as writing music, and, later, working with Danny Thomas to arrange the group's more challenging music. In addition to Erickson's powerful vocals, Hall's "electric jug" became the band's signature sound.  Later, Ronnie Leatherman returned for the third and final studio album, Bull of the Woods along with Thomas, and Sutherland.

Roky Erickson – guitar, lead vocals, songwriter (1965-1968, 1984, 2015) (died 2019)
Tommy Hall – electric jug, vocals, songwriter (1965-1968, 2015)
Stacy Sutherland – lead guitar, vocals, songwriter (1965-1969) (died 1978)
John Ike Walton – drums (1965-1967, 1984, 2015)
Benny Thurman – bass, vocals (1965-1966)
Ronnie Leatherman – bass, vocals (1965-1966, 1967, 1968, 1984, 2015)
Danny Galindo – bass (1966-1968)
Danny Thomas – drums, vocals, arrangements (1967-1969)
Duke Davis – bass (1968)
Fred Mitchim - guitar, vocals (2015)
Eli Southard - guitar (2015)

Other collaborators and contributors
 Powell St. John – member of Mother Earth, songwriter ("Slide Machine", "You Don't Know", "Monkey Island", "Take That Girl", "Kingdom of Heaven", "Right Track Now")
 Clementine Hall – wife of Tommy Hall, vocals and songwriting collaborations with Erickson ("Splash 1" and "I Had to Tell You")

Timeline

Post-Elevators careers

Roky Erickson

After pleading insanity in response to drug charges—he was arrested for possession of a single marijuana joint—Roky Erickson was committed to a mental hospital in 1969. Jason Ankeny of AllMusic has written that the treatments Erickson received during his three-and-a-half-year confinement may have contributed to his subsequent mental troubles. At that point the Elevators had already dissolved, although local promoters, along with their record label, International Artists, made some attempts to keep the band's name alive. Erickson attempted a sporadic solo career, burdened by management who exploited his instability and involved him in contracts that left him no control or profit from his music. After staying mostly out of sight in the 1980s, Erickson gradually returned to music in the 1990s, especially when the tribute album Where the Pyramid Meets the Eye—featuring players from ZZ Top, the Jesus and Mary Chain, and R.E.M., all of whom claimed Erickson's or the Elevators' influence—was released. He recorded All That May Do My Rhyme for the Trance Syndicate label, owned by the Butthole Surfers's King Coffey, who claimed Erickson told him it was the first time he'd ever been given a royalty check for his music. By 2001, Erickson's brother Sumner had been awarded custody of the troubled musician and helped him receive better psychological treatment, restore his physical health, and connect with a legal team that helped him untangle his complicated past contracts and begin receiving more royalties for his music. I Have Always Been Here Before, a 43-track compilation of his post-Elevators music, was released in 2005, and Erickson receives full royalties for the set. In 2010, he released True Love Cast Out All Evil, a full-length collaboration with indie rock band Okkervil River. Erickson died in Austin on May 31, 2019.

Stacy Sutherland
Stacy Sutherland formed his own band, Ice, which performed only in Houston and never released any material. In 1969, after a battle with heroin addiction, he was imprisoned in Texas on drug charges, the culmination of several years of drug-related trouble with the law. After his release Sutherland began to drink heavily. He continued to sporadically play music throughout the 1970s, occasionally with former members of the Elevators. Sutherland was shot and killed by his wife 'Bunni' on August 24, 1978 during a domestic dispute, and is buried in Center Point, Kerr County, Texas.

Danny Galindo
Danny Galindo played bass with Jimmie Vaughan's (Stevie Ray's older brother) band Storm in Austin, Texas, during the 1970s. He died in 2001 from complications of Hepatitis C.

Danny Thomas

Danny Thomas left the 13th Floor Elevators in 1968 and was hired to perform with blues guitarist Lightnin' Hopkins. After leaving Texas and returning to North Carolina, he played from 1970 to 1997 with: Lou Curry Band, Dogmeat, Arthur "Guitar Boogie" Smith, and Bessie Mae's Dream. During this time, he owned his own delivery company called Gophers, Inc. Prior to that he worked in accounting at Carolinas Medical Center (formerly Charlotte Memorial Hospital). He lives in Charlotte, North Carolina with his wife, Juanette, and they have two daughters, Christina Juanette Thomas Davis, and Tiffany Joan Thomas Johnson, and son Jason V. Brock, an author of horror fiction.

Benny Thurman
Benny Thurman joined a string of other bands, most notably Mother Earth, with Powell St. John, and played with Plum Nelly in the 1970s.

Tommy Hall

Tommy Hall currently lives in downtown San Francisco. In the 1980s, he was rumored to be the true identity of Texas outsider musician Jandek, but this has since been disproved. He became a devout follower of Scientology in the 1970s.  He has told interviewers that he is no longer interested in music or thinks of himself as a musician, and that "I lost my jug a long time ago."

Ronnie Leatherman
Bassist Leatherman lives in Kerrville, Texas, where he plays occasionally with local bands and fellow Elevator John Ike Walton.

John Ike Walton
Drummer Walton, like Leatherman, also settled in his hometown of Kerrville, Texas.

Reunions and tribute bands
Various Elevators tribute/related bands exist, such as the John Ike Walton Revival, featuring namesake John Ike Walton and Fred Mitchim, the Tommy Hall Schedule featuring Fred Mitchim, and Acid Tomb, featuring members of the Alice Rose. Erickson's youngest brother Sumner Erickson covers many Elevators songs with his band the Texcentrics.

Several partial reunions took place after the band's 1969 demise. Sutherland and Leatherman played 13 Floor Elevator songs at the Ol' Dog Saloon in Ingram, Texas on April 28, 1977.  Another partial reunion occurred at Liberty Lunch in Austin in 1984, with Roky alongside John Ike Walton on drums and Ronnie Leatherman on bass, with Sutherland's place taken by guitarist Greg Forest.  Tommy Hall did not participate.

On May 10, 2015 members of the band (Erickson, Hall, Leatherman, and Walton) joined for a 50th Anniversary reunion concert appearance at the psychedelic music festival Austin Psych Fest (Levitation 2015). Stacy Sutherland's guitar duties were covered by Fred Mitchim and Eli Southard.

Legacy
Today, the 13th Floor Elevators continue to influence new generations of musicians. In 1990, 21 contemporary bands—including R.E.M., ZZ Top, Richard Lloyd, the Jesus and Mary Chain, and Primal Scream—recorded covers of Elevators and solo Erickson songs on Where the Pyramid Meets the Eye: A Tribute to Roky Erickson, one of the first tribute albums. In 2005, a panel at the SXSW music festival discussed the music of the Elevators and Powell St. John, one of the Elevators' songwriters.

"You're Gonna Miss Me" was covered by Australian group Radio Birdman on the 1978 release of their album Radios Appear.

The song "Reverberation" was covered by Echo & the Bunnymen in 1990, with singer Noel Burke.

1980s drone/space-rock band Spacemen 3 were influenced by the 13th Floor Elevators, covering "Roller Coaster" twice, for their debut album, Sound of Confusion, and as a 17-minute version for their debut EP Walkin' With Jesus. Vocalist/guitarist Pete Kember also covered "Thru the Rhythm" with his post-Spacemen 3 project Spectrum.

"Slip Inside This House" was covered by Scottish alternative rock band Primal Scream (on their album Screamadelica), by Norwegian band Madrugada, by New York noise rock band Oneida (on their 2000 album Come on Everybody Let's Rock), and by electronic band The Shamen on their 1992 promo, Make It Mine.

Le Bonne Route, a 1996 album by Deniz Tek of Radio Birdman, features a song titled "Lunatics at the Edge of the World", which Tek described as "An ode to Syd Barrett and Roky Erickson."

In the 2000 movie High Fidelity, "You're Gonna Miss Me" is heard in the opening scene, and is the first song on the movie soundtrack album.

In 2006, Dell Computers used "You're Gonna Miss Me" in a television ad for their XPS laptop.

On April 24, 2007, during a radio promotion/interview before a concert, Jesse Lacey of Brand New credited the inspiration and a few lyrics for the song Degausser to Roky Erickson.

In 2009, "You're Gonna Miss Me" was used at length during a scene in episode 21 of Alan Ball's HBO series True Blood, culminating in a frantic, ultimately unsuccessful attempt by Lafayette Reynolds and Lettie Mae Thornton to remove Tara Thornton from the demonic influence of maenad Maryann Forrester.

The band has also been an influence on the "stoner rock" scene. Bands such as Queens of the Stone Age, Nebula, and Names and Faces regard them as an important influence.

Noted Hollywood actor Johnny Depp praised the Elevators in a 2004 interview with Esquire magazine: "Roky Erickson and the 13th Floor Elevators, a band out of Texas. They were basically the first psychedelic-rock band. 1965. And if you listen to old 13th Floor Elevators stuff—Roky Erickson especially, his voice—and then go back and listen to early Led Zeppelin, you know that Robert Plant absolutely copped everything from Roky Erickson. And it's amazing. And Roky Erickson is sitting in Austin, Texas; he's just there. And Robert Plant had a huge hit. It always goes back to those guys, you know? I love those fucking guys."

Parquet Courts, a band which includes two native Texans, included a cover of “Slide Machine” on 2014’s Content Nausea

Texas recording artist Ray Wylie Hubbard sang "No band was cooler than the 13th Floor Elevators" in his song "Screw You, We're from Texas" from his 2003 album Growl.

On January 19, 2014, the song "The Kingdom of Heaven (Is Within You)" was featured at the end of episode 2 of True Detective.

Discography

Studio albums

Selected compilation albums

Box sets

Singles

See also
Music of Austin
List of psychedelic rock artists

Notes

References

Bibliography
Eye Mind: The Saga of Roky Erickson and The 13th Floor Elevators by Paul Drummond, foreword by Julian Cope (Process Media, December 2007),

External links
A QUEST FOR PURE SANITY – THE PSYCHEDELIC POETRY OF TOMMY HALL
The Ralph Y. Michaels Elevators Collection

1965 establishments in Texas
1969 disestablishments in Texas
Acid rock music groups
Garage rock groups from Texas
Musical groups established in 1965
Musical groups disestablished in 1969
Musical groups from Austin, Texas
Psychedelic rock music groups from Texas
Radar Records artists